Brush Creek (formerly, Mountain Cottage and Mountain House) is an unincorporated community near Oroville in Butte County, California, United States. It lies at the east end of State Route 162, just beyond the Lake Oroville State Recreation Area.  It lies at an elevation of 3,540 feet (1,079 m). A post office operated at Brush Creek from 1856 until 1916, having moved once in 1902.

References

External links

Unincorporated communities in California
Unincorporated communities in Butte County, California